Kalaayaanulaa is a 2003 Maldivian romantic film written and directed by Fathimath Nahula. Produced under Mapa, the film stars Yoosuf Shafeeu, Niuma Mohamed and Aishath Shiranee playing pivotal roles.

Premise
Nashid (Yoosuf Shafeeu) and Eenaz (Niuma Mohamed) are childhood best friends who get separated when Nashid has to go abroad for a long time. Time flies and they grow up and drift apart from each other, but Eenaz continues to miss Nashid dearly. A decade later on her birthday, Nashid returns unexpectedly and shows up at her doorstep. After reconnecting, Nashid invites Eenaz to a reunion party with their old group of friends. At this party, Nashid introduces Leena (Aishath Shiranee) as his wife to Eenaz which shatters her heart as she had fallen in love with him. However, she chooses to keep her feelings secret in order to respect her friend's relationship.

Leena, who had previously been involved in a car accident was advised not to become pregnant by her doctors within the next three years. However, one and a half years later, Leena gets pregnant by avoiding taking her birth control pills and unknowingly risks her life. Despite hers and Nashid's best efforts, Leena ends up having a miscarriage. Meanwhile, Eenaz's manager, Madhih (Asad Shareef), who had previously sexually harassed her at work, later comes to her parents asking for marriage approval in order to taunt her. Eenaz marries him as she is desperate to get over Nashid.

5 years later,
Eenaz is trapped in a loveless, unhappy, and abusive marriage. Nashid's and Leena's life in the bedroom had taken a toll as Leena's health conditions post-miscarriage make it difficult for them to make love. They try many treatment options, but nothing seems to work. Eenaz discovers that Madhih has been having an extramarital affair behind her back and confronts him, which in return angers Madhih. Nashid walks into Madhih physically abusing Eenaz and rescues her. He offers her his support and helps her get a divorce from Madhih. He also offers her a job at his company as his personal secretary. The two get closer once again and Nashid realizes that Eenaz loves him. He also realizes that he wants to keep her happy and safe. Eager to fulfill his needs in the bedroom, Nashid proposes a polygamous marriage to Eenaz as he is unwilling to divorce Leena. After a lot of disagreement, Leena agrees to the arrangement vowing to get better treatment abroad to cure her condition. She meets and warns Eenaz that this arrangement would be temporary, and that Nashid would always prioritize her. Eenaz, despite knowing Nashid's intentions and that he may never truly love her decides to marry him regardless.

As Nashid and Eenaz embark on their married life and engage in a mostly physical relationship, Leena goes abroad and seeks treatment determined to have Nashid all to herself once again. Just as Eenaz and Nashid start getting closer emotionally, Leena returns having cured her condition once and for all. This leads to Nashid spending most of his time with Leena, neglecting Eenaz. Eenaz, realizing that Nashid would never love her the way she does, decides to separate from him. She leaves Nashid to spend the rest of his life with his one true love Leena, after revealing to them that she is now pregnant with Nashid's child.

Cast 
 Yoosuf Shafeeu as Nashid, Leena and Eenaz's husband 
 Niuma Mohamed as Eenaz, Nashid's best friend turned 2nd wife 
 Mariyam Enash Sinan as young Eenaz
 Aishath Shiranee as Leena, Nashid's 1st wife 
 Asad Shareef as Madhih, Enaz's ex-husband 
 Ahmed Nabeel Mohamed as Leena's gynecologist
 Mariyam Enash Sinan as Eenas, Eenaz's sister 
 Aminath Rasheedha as Zulfa, Eenaz's mother
 Abdul Raheem as Eenaz's father
 Abdul Satthar as Leena's father
 Ahmed Saeed as Niyaa
 Arifa Ibrahim as Leena's mother
 Khadheeja Ibrahim Didi (Special appearance in the song "Hee Samaasa Rattehinna")
 Ravee Farooq as Sam (Special appearance in the song "Nudhaaney Mireyge Handhaanthah")

Soundtrack

Response
Upon release, the film received mainly positive reviews from critics. Hilath Rasheed reviewing from Haveeru Daily praised the performance by lead actors and "cleverness" of director Nahula for opening up "sexual impotency, a taboo subject for Maldivian society, for public debate and exploring the implications it has for marriage".

Accolades

References

2003 films
2000s romance films
Maldivian romance films